Below is the identified timeline of the History of the Turkic peoples between the 6th and 14th centuries.

6th century

7th century

8th century

9th century

10th century

11th century

12th century

13th century

See also 
Oghuz Turks
List of Turkic dynasties and countries
Nomadic empire
Göktürk family tree

Notes

References 

Encyclopædia Britannica, Expo 70 ed., vol 13, pp 328–330; vol 20, pp 192–196; vol 22, pp 400–401
Jean Paul Roux: Historie des Turcs. (Translated by Prof Dr. Aykut Kazancıgil and Lale Arslan Özcan) Kabalcı Yayınevi, İstanbul, 2007
Arthur Koestler: The Thirteenth Tribe (Translated by Belkis Çorakçı) Say Kitap Pazarlama,İstanbul, 1976
Melek Tekin: Türk Tarih Ansiklopedisi, Milliyet yayınları, İstanbul, 1991

Turkic timelines